Groupie usually refers to a kind of fan assumed to be more interested in relationships with rockstars than in their music.

Groupie or groupies may also refer to:

Films
Groupie (1993 film), directed by Nadav Levitan
Groupie (2010 film), starring Taryn Manning

Literature
Groupie (1969), an autobiographical book by Jenny Fabian, co-written by Johnny Byrne

Music

Albums
Groupies (album), by Cheer Chen, 2002

Songs
"Groupie" (Samir & Viktor song), 2015
"Groupie (Superstar)", original title of the song better known as "Superstar" by Delaney and Bonnie, with versions recorded by many artists
"Groupie", by New Riders of the Purple Sage from Gypsy Cowboy, 1972
"Groupies", by Hard Boys from A-Town Hard Heads, 1992
"Groupies", by rapper Future from DS2, 2015

See also
Groupie Girl